The Holden Nova is a compact car that was produced by the Holden-Toyota alliance, known as United Australian Automobile Industries (UAAI) in Australia between August 1989 and 1996. The alliance, and therefore the car, was a result of the Button car plan which attempted to rationalise the Australian car manufacturing industry. The Nova was sold and marketed under the Holden nameplate, although it was a badge engineered version of the Toyota Corolla, with barely any input from General Motors, although they referred to it as the GM S platform. However it received minor stylistic changes. The Nova was sold as a four-door sedan and five-door hatchback.

In all years, the Nova was outsold by the Toyota Corolla in Australia, and the car was replaced by the Holden Astra in 1996.

First generation (LE, LF; 1989–1994) 

The LE and LF series, based on the Corolla E90 were sold between August 1989 and September 1994. The LE was offered with Toyota's 1.4-litre  engine (hatchback only) and 1.6-litre  engine, in Holden's traditional SL (hatchback only), SLX and SLE trims. The SLE hatchback was replaced by a GS model, although SLE continued as a trim on the sedan, then in October 1992, a fuel-injected 1.8-litre  engine was offered for the GS hatchback. The 1.4-litre option and the SLEs were unavailable from 1993.

Second generation (LG; 1994–1996) 

The LG Nova was sold between 1994 and 1996, although a smaller range was offered. The SLX trim level was equipped with a 1.6-litre  engine, while the GS trim level denoted the fitment of the 1.8-litre engine. Four-door sedan and five-door hatchback options were offered for both levels, and all engines featured fuel injection.

References 

Nova
Cars introduced in 1989
1980s cars
1990s cars
Toyota Corolla
Cars discontinued in 1996